Aechmea fuerstenbergii is a species of flowering plant in the genus Aechmea. This species is native to Peru and Bolivia.

References

fuerstenbergii
Plants described in 1878
Flora of Peru
Flora of Bolivia